Eladio Zorrilla Jiménez (born 13 July 1990), commonly known as Elady, is a Spanish footballer who plays for CD Tenerife. Mainly a left winger, he can also play as a forward.

Club career
Born in La Puerta de Segura, Jaén, Andalusia, Elady made his senior debut with Orcera CF in the regional leagues. In 2008 he moved to La Puerta CD; initially assigned to the youth setup, he became a first-team regular during his two-season spell.

In 2010 Elady signed for Villacarrillo CF, still in the lower levels. On 10 July 2012, after helping the side in their promotion to Tercera División, he moved straight to Segunda División B after agreeing to a contract with Real Jaén.

On 15 July 2013, after being rarely used, Elady returned to Villacarrillo, now in the fourth tier. The following 1 July he signed for La Hoya Lorca CF, but cut ties with the club on 26 August and subsequently returned to his previous club.

On 3 October 2014, Elady joined fellow fourth division side Écija Balompié, but left the club the following January and signed for Linares Deportivo in the same category. On 14 July 2015 he moved to Atlético Mancha Real, scoring a career-best 21 goals during his first campaign, which ended in promotion.

On 18 January 2017, after scoring ten goals in only 20 matches, Elady signed a 18-month contract with Real Murcia in the third division. On 17 July 2018, after contributing with 12 goals as his side missed out promotion in the play-offs, he moved abroad and joined KS Cracovia on a two-year deal.

Elady made his professional debut on 29 July 2018, playing the entire second half in a 0–2 away loss against KKS Lech Poznań for the Ekstraklasa championship. After only one more match, he returned to his home country and agreed to a deal with FC Cartagena on 9 August.

Elady was a regular starter for the Efesé during his first campaigns, scoring a career-best 19 goals in his first season and adding a further seven in his second, as the club achieved promotion to Segunda División. He scored his first professional goal on 4 October 2020 at the age of 30, netting the opener in a 2–1 home win over CD Lugo.

On 14 July 2021, Elady signed a two-year deal with fellow second division side CD Tenerife.

References

External links

1990 births
Living people
Sportspeople from the Province of Jaén (Spain)
Spanish footballers
Footballers from Andalusia
Association football wingers
Association football forwards
Segunda División B players
Tercera División players
Divisiones Regionales de Fútbol players
Real Jaén footballers
Écija Balompié players
Linares Deportivo footballers
Lorca FC players
Real Murcia players
FC Cartagena footballers
CD Tenerife players
Ekstraklasa players
MKS Cracovia (football) players
Spanish expatriate footballers
Spanish expatriate sportspeople in Poland
Expatriate footballers in Poland